Fistulina is a genus of fungi in the family Fistulinaceae. Species in the genus cause a brown rot of both dead and living hardwood trees.

See also
List of Agaricales genera

References

External links

Fistulinaceae
Agaricales genera
Taxa named by Jean Baptiste François Pierre Bulliard